Dublin Castle was the centre of the government of Ireland under English and later British rule. "Dublin Castle" is used metonymically to describe British rule in Ireland. The Castle held only the executive branch of government and the Privy Council of Ireland, both appointed by the British government. The Castle did not hold the judicial branch, which was centred on the Four Courts, or the legislature, which met at College Green till the Act of Union 1800 and thereafter at Westminster.

Head

The head of the administration or Chief governor of Ireland was variously known as the justicar, the Lord Deputy, from the seventeenth century the Lord Lieutenant of Ireland, and later the Viceroy. Before 1707 he represented the government of the Kingdom of England, then that of the Kingdom of Great Britain, and finally from 1801 that of the United Kingdom. He was also the personal representative in Ireland of the monarch. When the chief governor was absent in England his authority was exercised by three Lords Justices.

By the nineteenth century, the Lord Lieutenant was declining in importance by comparison with his chief aide, the Chief Secretary for Ireland. By the late nineteenth century the Lord Lieutenant was sometimes, but not always, a member of the British cabinet, but the Chief Secretary invariably was a member.

The Government of Ireland Act 1920 gave the Lord Lieutenant a new role, that of the Crown's representative in the two new Irish UK regions of Northern Ireland and Southern Ireland. However, the Irish War of Independence and subsequent Civil War meant that Southern Ireland's institutions never came into operation and Northern Ireland's institutions were not established until 1921. Upon the independence of the Irish Free State from the United Kingdom in 1922, the Lord Lieutenancy was abolished, with its functions being transferred to the two new offices of Governor-General of the Irish Free State and Governor of Northern Ireland respectively.

Other officers
Other major officers in the Dublin Castle administration included the Chief Secretary for Ireland, the Under-Secretary, the Lord Chancellor of Ireland, the Attorney-General for Ireland (briefly replaced under the Government of Ireland Act by the Attorney-General for Southern Ireland), and the Solicitor-General for Ireland. All of these posts were abolished in 1922. The Chief Secretary's office evolved into the administrative basis for the new President of the Executive Council of the Irish Free State, effectively the prime minister, with the Under Secretary's administrative role becoming that of the new chief civil servant in the Irish Government, the Secretary to the Executive Council.

Civil service
Just as the Civil Service ("His Majesty's Home Civil Service") evolved from the officials of the various government departments around Whitehall in London, so the corresponding officials in Dublin evolved into the Irish civil service. The Irish Office in London  was the part of the British civil service which liaised with Dublin Castle, just as the Colonial Office liaised with colonial governments. After the Partition of Ireland, most Irish civil servants transferred to either the Civil Service of the Irish Free State or the Civil Service of Northern Ireland. Those based in the Free State who were unsympathetic to the new regime were allowed to retire early on reduced pension.

See also
Dublin Gazette

Sources
 
 
 
 
 
 
 
 
 

Early Modern Ireland
History of Ireland (1801–1923)
Government of Ireland
Government of the Kingdom of Great Britain